In My Mind is the debut studio album by American musician Pharrell Williams. The album was released on July 25, 2006 by Star Trak Entertainment, Virgin Records and Interscope Records. It debuted at number 3 on the US Billboard 200, selling 142,000 copies in its first week of release. The album is also certified Silver in the United Kingdom for sales of over 60,000 copies. In My Mind would go on to receive a nomination for Best Rap Album at the 49th Annual Grammy Awards.

Background
In June 2003, after having produced and featured on several songs by other artists, Williams released his debut single "Frontin'", featuring Jay-Z. Despite insisting that the single was a one-off, and that he was purely a producer and not an artist in his own right, it was announced that Williams would release his own studio album.

The album includes the three already-released singles "Can I Have It Like That" (featuring Gwen Stefani), "Angel" (only released in the UK) and "Number One" (featuring Kanye West) and performances featuring Jay-Z, Nelly, Slim Thug, Snoop Dogg, Lauren London, Jamie Cullum and Pusha T of Clipse. Originally the album had been slated for release on November 15, 2005, but the date was delayed at Williams' request. Most recently, a music video for "That Girl" (featuring Snoop Dogg) was released and has been receiving airplay on VH1. On this album, Pharrell makes his solo production debut without his partner Chad Hugo. In an interview on the delay, he stated that he felt the album needed more work. Nearly six months later, it was finally released.

Critical reception

The album received generally mixed reviews from critics. Christian Hoard of Rolling Stone called it "still only so-so, offering a series of modestly tuneful, sometimes snoozy soul-pop-hip-hop songs". Entertainment Weekly said the album "seems divided against itself, rest assured that all of the songs have something in common: they're not remotely catchy". For AllMusic, Andy Kellman wrote that "it's not like any part of it is flat-out poor, but it's a shame it didn't turn out better". In his consumer guide for MSN Music, Robert Christgau gave the album a two-star honorable mention rating, indicating a "likable effort consumers attuned to its overriding aesthetic or individual vision may well enjoy". He cited "Raspy Shit" and "Number One" as highlights and quipped, "keepin' it playa like he says, for exactly what that's worth".

Accolades
The album was nominated for Best Rap Album at the 49th Annual Grammy Awards, but lost to Release Therapy by Ludacris.

Commercial performance
In My Mind debuted at number  three on the US Billboard 200 behind LeToya's self-titled debut album and the compilation's Now 22, selling 142,000 copies in its first week. The album dropped to the number nine in its second week, selling an additional 51,000 units, for a two-week total of 193,000 copies sold. As of March 2014, In My Mind has sold 406,000 copies in the United States. The album has sold 2,889,025 copies worldwide.

Track listing
All songs written and produced by Pharrell Williams; songs with co-writers are noted.

Charts

Weekly charts

Year-end charts

Certifications

References

Pharrell Williams albums
2006 debut albums
Albums produced by Pharrell Williams
Interscope Records albums
Star Trak Entertainment albums